David Gourlay Senior is a former Scottish international lawn and indoor bowler born on 24 May 1937.

Bowls career
Gourlay Sr. helped Scotland win the 1984 World Outdoor Bowls Team Event (the W.M.Leonard Trophy) in Aberdeen.

He has won the Scottish and British Indoor Pairs, Triples and Fours Championships and has been capped by Scotland both indoors and outdoors.
 
His greatest achievement was winning the 1982 Commonwealth Games Pairs title with John Watson.
His wife Sarah Gourlay won a Fours Gold Medal at the 1985 World Outdoor Championships in Melbourne and his son David Gourlay Jr. won the 1996 World Indoor Bowls Championship.

He is related to the Scottish footballers James Gourlay and Jimmy Gourlay.

References

Scottish male bowls players
Living people
1937 births
Bowls players at the 1982 Commonwealth Games
Commonwealth Games medallists in lawn bowls
Commonwealth Games gold medallists for Scotland
David, Sr.
Medallists at the 1982 Commonwealth Games